The 2009 Phillips 66 Big 12 Men's Basketball Championship was the 13th edition of the Big 12 Conference's championship tournament held at the Ford Center in Oklahoma City from March 11 until March 14, 2009.  The University of Missouri Tigers defeated the Baylor University Bears 73–60 in the championship game to claim their first Big 12 Tournament title for Mizzou.

Seeding
The Tournament consisted of a 12 team single-elimination tournament with the top 4 seeds receiving a bye.

Schedule

Tournament bracket

All-Tournament Team
Most Outstanding Player – DeMarre Carroll, Missouri

See also
2009 Big 12 Conference women's basketball tournament
2009 NCAA Division I men's basketball tournament
2008–09 NCAA Division I men's basketball rankings

References

External links
Official 2009 Big 12 Men's Basketball Tournament Bracket

Tournament
Big 12 men's basketball tournament
Big 12 men's basketball tournament
Big 12 men's basketball tournament
Basketball competitions in Oklahoma City
College sports tournaments in Oklahoma